Kurt Børge Nikolaj "Nikkelaj" Nielsen (2 September 1924 – 17 July 1986) was a Danish professional football (soccer) player and manager, who most prominently coached the Danish national football team from 1976 to 1979.

He started his career for Danish club Skovshoved IF, before he moved abroad to play professionally for French clubs Olympique de Marseille and AS Aix. He played three matches and scored three goals for the Danish national team during 1952 and 1953, before his professional career hindered further games. Following his retirement in 1956, Nikkelaj coached a number of Danish clubs, before he was appointed Danish national team manager in 1976. He coached Denmark to 13 wins in his 31 games in charge, but did not manage to qualify Denmark for any major tournaments.

References

External links
Danish national team player profile
Danish national team manager profile
Profile

1924 births
1986 deaths
People from Gentofte Municipality
Danish men's footballers
Danish expatriate men's footballers
Expatriate footballers in France
Olympique de Marseille players
Ligue 1 players
Danish football managers
Denmark international footballers
Denmark national football team managers
Herfølge Boldklub managers
Association football forwards
Skovshoved IF players
Skovshoved IF managers
Pays d'Aix FC players
Frederikshavn fI players
Sportspeople from the Capital Region of Denmark